Nathaniel J. McFadden (born August 3, 1946) is an American politician who represented district 45 in the Maryland State Senate from January 11, 1995 to January 9, 2019, and who was the Senate's president pro tem from January 10, 2007 to January 9, 2019.

Background
Born in Philadelphia, Pennsylvania, August 3, 1946, McFadden attended high school at the Baltimore City College, graduating in 1964. McFadden received a B.A. from Morgan State College in geography & history education in 1968. M.S. (history & social sciences), 1972. Educator. Teacher, Dunbar High School, 1968-75.  He also was an educator at Lake Clifton-Eastern High School in Baltimore, MD, beginning in 1989 and was an Educational Opportunity Program (EOP) through 1994. He has a wife, three children, and five grandchildren.

In the legislature
McFadden was chairman of the Baltimore City Senate Delegation. He was the President Pro Tem of the Senate after serving as the Majority Leader from 2003 to 2007. Senate Chair, Joint Audit Committee, 2001-. Member, Budget and Taxation Committee, 1995- (public safety, transportation, economic development & natural resources subcommittee, 1995–99; pensions subcommittee, 1995-; education, business & administration subcommittee, 2000-; vice-chair, capital budget subcommittee, 2007-, member, 2003-); Special Joint Committee on Pensions, 1995-;

Democratic party activist
In December 2007, McFadden was chosen by the Obama for President campaign to appear on the ballot as a male delegate for Obama from Maryland's 7th congressional district.

References

External links
 
Bills sponsored 2008 20072006200520042003 2002 2001 2000 1999 1998
Project Vote Smart - Senator Nathaniel J. McFadden (MD) profile
Follow the Money - Nathaniel J. McFadden
2006 2004 2002 1998 campaign contributions

1946 births
21st-century American politicians
African-American state legislators in Maryland
Baltimore City College alumni
Living people
Democratic Party Maryland state senators
Morgan State University alumni
Politicians from Baltimore
Politicians from Philadelphia
21st-century African-American politicians
20th-century African-American people